Ann-Kathrin Kramer (born 4 April 1966) is a German actress and writer.

Biography
Kramer was born and educated in Wuppertal but left school at the age of sixteen.  She worked as a shop window designer, made portraits of tourists in Greece, and applied to fashion school without success. She eventually took the "Technische Abitur" (baccalaureate-level qualification), but decided against studying physics as she had initially planned. At 26, she went to the Gmelin Drama School in Munich and completed her training as an actress.

Kramer took singing lessons with Anneliese Hofmann de Boer and acting lessons with John Costopoulos in the Lee Strasberg Method.

She has two brothers and a son who was born in 1997 from her relationship with Jan Josef Liefers. She married Harald Krassnitzer in 2009.

Kramer works with the charity "Dunkelziffer - Hilfe für sexuell missbrauchte Kinder" (Unreported - Help for Sexually Abused Children) in Hamburg and represents the "Bundesstiftung Kinderhospiz" (Federal Children's Hospice Foundation).

In 2005, she published the children's book Matilda - Oder die aus dem Haus ohne Fenster (Matilda - Or the House Without Windows), with a sequel, Neues von Matilda, dem Mädchen aus dem Haus ohne Fenster (News From Matilda, the Girl From the House Without Windows), in 2014.

In 2008, Stefan Loeffler wrote a biography of Kramer titled Ann-Kathrin Kramer - Begegnungen (Ann-Kathrin Kramer - Encounters).

Selected filmography

Bibliography
 Matilda - Oder die aus dem Haus ohne Fenster (2005)
 Neues von Matilda, dem Mädchen aus dem Haus ohne Fenster (2014)

References

External links

 
 
 Ann-Kathrin Kramer interview with Tobias Goltz, 3 January 2008
 Stefan Loeffler - Ann-Kathrin Kramer - Begegnungen

1966 births
Living people
German television actresses
Actors from Wuppertal